Domestic Terminal railway station is the terminus station of the Airport line in Queensland, Australia. It serves the Domestic Terminal at Brisbane Airport, opening on 5 May 2001 at the same time as the line.

The station along with the line is owned and operated by Airtrain Citylink under a BOOT scheme. It will pass to Queensland Rail ownership in 2036.

Services are operated by City network. Although TransLink's go card is able to be used, the station is not included in the TransLink fare structure, with Airtrain able to charge a premium fare.

Connection to the airport terminal
The station is connected to the Brisbane Airport's domestic terminal by a covered elevated footbridge, with an elevator and escalators to the kerbside immediately in front of the entrance to the terminal.

Services
Domestic Terminal is served by City network Airport line services to Roma Street, Park Road and Varsity Lakes.

Services by platform

References

External links

Domestic station Queensland's Railways on the Internet
[ Domestic station] TransLink travel information

Airport railway stations in Australia
Railway stations in Brisbane
Railway stations in Australia opened in 2001
Brisbane Airport